Sediminicola luteus is a Gram-negative and rod-shaped bacterium from the genus of Sediminicola.

References

Flavobacteria
Bacteria described in 2006